Serena Williams and Venus Williams were the defending champions. However, Serena withdrew from the tournament because of a foot injury and Venus chose to participate in the singles event only. Vania King and Yaroslava Shvedova defeated Liezel Huber and Nadia Petrova 2–6, 6–4, 7–6(7–4) in the final. This match was played over two days due to heavy rainfall on September 12.

Seeds

Draw

Finals

Top half

Section 1

Section 2

Bottom half

Section 3

Section 4

External links 
 Main draw
2010 US Open – Women's draws and results at the International Tennis Federation

Women's Doubles
US Open (tennis) by year – Women's doubles
2010 in women's tennis
2010 in American women's sports